The Mud River is a tributary of the Green River in western Kentucky in the United States. Via the Green and Ohio rivers, it is part of the Mississippi River watershed.

Course
It joins the Green River at the town of Rochester. 
At Huntsville, KY, the river has a mean annual discharge of 350 cubic feet per second.

Browning Mill Pond 
The Mud River was home to the Browning Mill Pond. A grist mill there was powered by the flow of the river. The old rock dam is still visible, although almost dismantled due to spring-time flooding and age. Even though its demise was years ago, water still passes over it rapidly, even at low summer levels.

See also
List of Kentucky rivers
Other streams named Mud River

References

Rivers of Kentucky
Rivers of Logan County, Kentucky
Rivers of Muhlenberg County, Kentucky
Rivers of Butler County, Kentucky
Green River (Kentucky)